The Palm House is a large palm house in the Royal Botanic Gardens, Kew, in London, that specialises in growing palms and other tropical and subtropical plants. It was completed in 1848. Many of its plants are endangered or extinct in the wild. Features include an upper walkway, taking the visitor into the branches of the larger plants. Kew also has the even larger "Temperate House", kept at lower temperatures.

Initially built as status symbols in Victorian Britain, several examples of ornate glass and iron greenhouses, often but not always called "the Palm House", can still be found in botanical gardens and parks such as Liverpool's Sefton Park and Stanley Park, and in other countries.

The Palm House was the first greenhouse to be built on this scale. It was also the first large-scale structural use of wrought iron.

History 

One of the earliest examples of a palm house is located in the Belfast Botanic Gardens. Designed by Charles Lanyon, the building was completed in 1840. It was constructed by the iron-maker Richard Turner, who would later build the Palm House at Kew. Sir William J. Hooker was appointed Director of the Royal Botanic Garden at Kew in 1841. As part of his plan to improve its image, Sir William asked Decimus Burton to draw up preliminary sketches of a new Palm House for review in 1844. Decimus and Nicole Burton completed the design, although Richard Turner was primarily involved. It was built between 1844 and 1848. After an interview with Sir William, Turner submitted his plans along with an estimate of the cost to the Board of Works. The Board of Works, in turn, asked Burton to review Turner's plans.

Burton initially disagreed with Turner's original plans, which adopted the Gothic style he had used in his prior works. Burton preferred the Neoclassical style which informed the design of the Palm House. Burton did take notice of Turner's decisions over which plants should be planted where. Turner knew of greenhouses' "problems of heating, ventilation, and structural" issues.

According to some accounts, Turner sent his plan of the Palm House to the Building News. Thomas Drew also wrote to the Building News claiming "to have an authoritative statement from Turner...”" He claimed that "the Palm House was not only erected by him but was solely his design, although varied out under the supervision of Mr. Decimus Burton".

Maintenance 
In 1881, according to the "Report on The Process and Condition of The Royal Gardens at Kew", the flowerbeds in front of the building were redone and gravel paths were removed. The flowers at the back of the Palm House and the low areas required modified drainage.

Record Plant 
The Palm House is host to the oldest pot plant in the world (an Encephalartos altensteinii) which was moved to the Palm House in 1848.

References

Decimus Burton buildings
Grade I listed buildings in the London Borough of Richmond upon Thames
Greenhouses
Royal Botanic Gardens, Kew